Glee: The Quarterback is an extended play (EP) by the cast of the American musical television show Glee. It was released on iTunes on October 7, 2013, three days before the fifth season's third episode "The Quarterback". The album features six songs recorded for the episode, which killed off Cory Monteith's character, Finn Hudson.

Commercial performance
Predictions suggested the EP would debut in the top ten of the United States' Billboard 200, selling around 30,000 copies. By October 16, 2013, the album debuted at number 7 on the Billboard 200, selling 47,000 copies. This is the franchise's first album to chart in the top ten in the United States in a year and half, since the third season release of Glee, The Music: The Graduation Album on May 15, 2012. This album is also the fourteenth album of the series to chart in the top ten. The last album of the Glee franchise to chart on the Billboard 200 was the album Glee Sings the Beatles, which debuted at number 38. The extended play also debuted at number 1 on Billboard Soundtracks.

Track listing

Personnel

Adam Anders – arranger, engineer, producer, soundtrack producer, vocals
Chris Colfer – vocals
Peer Åström – engineer, mixing, producer
Geoff Bywater – executive in charge of music
Dante Di Loreto – executive producer
Bob Dylan – composer
Brad Falchuk – executive producer
Chrissie Hynde – composer
Jonathan Larson – composer
Tom Kelly – composer
Kevin McHale – vocals
Lea Michele – vocals

Ryan Murphy – producer, soundtrack producer
Chord Overstreet – vocals
Kimberly Perry – composer
Ryan Peterson – engineer
Amber Riley – vocals
Naya Rivera – vocals
Mark Salling – vocals
Bruce Springsteen – composer
Billy Steinberg – composer
James Taylor – composer
Jenna Ushkowitz – vocals

Charts

See also
 List of songs in Glee (season 5)

References

2013 EPs
2013 soundtrack albums
Columbia Records EPs
Glee (TV series) albums